Sir James Blount (died 1493) (sometimes spelt Blunt) was commander of the English fortress of Hammes, near Calais.

Blount was the son of Walter Blount, 1st Baron Mountjoy, and uncle of William Blount, 4th Baron Mountjoy. In 1473, he sat in Parliament as the MP for Derbyshire.

When, in 1484, the Earl of Oxford and William, 2nd Viscount Beaumont, were imprisoned at Hammes, Blount was apparently persuaded to switch to the Lancastrian side. Blount, Oxford, and Beaumont fled to join Henry Tudor, (the future Henry VII of England who was then living in exile in France), leaving his wife, Elizabeth, in charge. She and the garrison held out for months against Richard III's forces, until in early 1485 they surrendered in return for safe passage into France. Sir James then landed with Henry Tudor's forces in 1485 at Milford Haven, where he was knighted.

Blount appears as a minor character in William Shakespeare's play Richard III.

15th-century births
1493 deaths
English soldiers
English knights
James
People of the Tudor period
English MPs 1472
15th-century soldiers
Members of the Parliament of England for Derbyshire
Younger sons of barons